Sundararajan Krishna (4 March 1938 – 16 July 2013) was an Indian cricketer. He played a total of eight first-class matches for Mysore between 1961 and 1964.

References

External links
 

1938 births
2013 deaths
Indian cricketers
Karnataka cricketers
Cricketers from Bangalore